The Concessionary Bus Travel Act 2007 is an Act of the Parliament of the United Kingdom which entitles all people resident in England who are either disabled or over the age of 60 to free travel on local buses at off-peak times anywhere within England (transport being a devolved matter and therefore within the purview of the Scottish Parliament, Welsh Assembly and Northern Ireland Assembly); previously, free travel had only been available within the recipient's local authority area.

According to Age UK free bus travel is a life line enabling older people to maintain independence and get to local services, notably health care and shopping.  Free bus travel combats social isolation and increases social inclusion allowing older people to stay in touch with their friends and families.

Funding
Under the scheme, bus companies are compensated by local authorities for carrying passholders, and the authorities in turn receive funding from central Government to offset the cost, in the form of a special grant under s.88B of the Local Government Finance Act 1988, for which a total of £212 million has been allocated.  This is distributed using a funding formula on the basis of four factors (eligible
population, bus patronage, overnight visitors and retail floor space), in the following proportions:

The funding allocated by Government was criticised by some as inadequate, and some local authorities anticipate budget shortfalls as a result. The government defended its decision not to compensate local authorities on the basis of actual costs incurred on the grounds that "such an approach would mean that the central government would hold all the financial risks but have no commensurate control of how the risks are managed".

As of 2014 there is concern about funding for this service, government funding fell 39% from 2010 and Local authorities are forced to pay for this at the expense of other services.  

Rural bus services and less popular routes are being cut due to low funding and the Local Government Association plans to appeal to George Osborne, Chancellor of the Exchequer to reverse cuts and protect bus services under threat.

Passage through Parliament

As is common for uncontroversial measures, the Bill was introduced in the House of Lords, where it received cross-party support. It received third reading from the Lords on 5 February 2006, and from the Commons on 28 June, with minor amendments, including one allowing the Government to make payments from public funds to fund the scheme, since money bills cannot be started in the Lords.  These amendments were agreed to on 5 July, and the Bill received Royal Assent on 19 July.  Under the commencement order, the Bill entered into force to allow the making of some regulations by the Secretary of State, and for some other preliminary purposes, on 17 October 2007, and in full on 1 April 2008.

References

External links
The Concessionary Bus Travel Act 2007, as amended from the National Archives.
The Concessionary Bus Travel Act 2007, as originally enacted from the National Archives.
Explanatory notes to the Concessionary Bus Travel Act 2007.

United Kingdom Acts of Parliament 2007
Acts of the Parliament of the United Kingdom concerning England
2007 in transport
2007 in England
History of transport in the United Kingdom